Jagić is a Croatian surname. Notable people with the surname include:

 Vatroslav Jagić (1838–1923), Croatian philologist
 Dorta Jagić (born 1974), Croatian poet and writer

See also
 Janić

Croatian surnames